Dźwigała is a Polish surname. Notable people with the surname include:

 Adam Dźwigała (born 1995), Polish footballer
 Dariusz Dźwigała (born 1969), Polish footballer

See also
 

Polish-language surnames